The Houston SaberCats are an American professional rugby union team based in Houston, Texas. The team was founded in 2017 and competes in Major League Rugby, the top-level rugby union competition in the United States and Canada that played its first season in 2018. The SaberCats organization was born from one of the founding amateur rugby clubs that pooled resources to emerge professionally, and were the first in MLR membership to build a rugby-specific stadium intended for MLR competition.

Home field

Houston plays their games in SaberCats Stadium, which was opened on April 13, 2019. In February 2018, the City of Houston agreed to fund $3.2 million of the $15.25 million needed to build a permanent rugby stadium for use by the Houston SaberCats at Houston Sports Park. On July 17, the SaberCats announced that a three-year naming rights were awarded to British multinational software and technology company Aveva, and that it would be initially known as "Aveva Stadium". Following this deal, the venue became known as "SaberCats Stadium".

Houston Sports Park is also the permanent training ground for Major League Soccer soccer team Houston Dynamo as well as the Houston Dash women's soccer team.

During the 2018 regular season, the SaberCats played their home matches at Dyer Stadium and trained at Athlete Training and Health in Houston. The team also played at Constellation Field, home of the Sugar Land Skeeters, for part of the 2019 season, and for their exhibition matches in 2017 and 2018. Also, in April 2019, while the new pitch at SaberCats Stadium healed, the team returned to Dyer Stadium to play one match against San Diego before returning to SaberCats Stadium.

Broadcasts
2019 home games were shown on KUBE-TV an independent station in Houston.

Sponsorship

Players and personnel

Current squad

The Houston SaberCats squad for the 2023 Major League Rugby season is:

 

 Senior 15s internationally capped players are listed in bold.
 MLR teams are allowed to field up to ten overseas players per match.

Current Coaching staff
 Pote Human (Head Coach)
 Campbell Johnstone (Assistant Coach – forwards)
 Ashley Dixon (Strength & Conditioning Coach)

Head coaches
  Justin Fitzpatrick (2017–2019)
 Paul Emerick (2019)
 Paul Healy (2020–2021)
 Pote Human (2022–Present)

Former Assistant Coaches
 Sam Windsor (Backs – 2017–2019)
 Paul Emerick (Backs – 2017–2020)
 Matt Trouville (Lineouts – 2017–2019)
 Neil Kelly (Defense – 2019)
 Darren Morris (Forwards – 2019)

Captains
Kyle Sumsion (2018)
Matt Trouville (2019)
De Wet Roos (2020)
Luke Beauchamp (2021) (co-captain)
De Wet Roos (2021) (co-captain)
Dean Muir (2022–)

Records

Season standings

Notes

2018 season

Exhibition

Regular season

2019 season

Exhibition

Regular season

2020 season

On March 12, 2020, MLR announced the season would go on hiatus immediately for 30 days due to fears surrounding the 2019–2020 coronavirus pandemic. It was cancelled the following week

Regular season

2021 season

Regular season

2022 season

Regular season

Post season

Notes

References

External links
 

 

 
Major League Rugby teams
Rugby union teams in Texas
Rugby union in Houston
Sports in Houston
2017 establishments in Texas
Rugby clubs established in 2017